Steklov Institute of Mathematics or Steklov Mathematical Institute is a premier research institute based in Moscow, specialized in mathematics, and a part of the Russian Academy of Sciences. The institute is named after Vladimir Andreevich Steklov, who in 1919 founded the Institute of Physics and Mathematics in  Leningrad. In 1934, this institute was split into separate parts for physics and mathematics, and the mathematical part became the Steklov Institute. At the same time, it was moved to Moscow. The first director of the Steklov Institute was Ivan Matveyevich Vinogradov. From 19611964, the institute's director was the notable mathematician Sergei Chernikov.

The old building of the Institute in Leningrad became its Department in Leningrad. Today, that department has become a separate institute, called the St. Petersburg Department of Steklov Institute of Mathematics of Russian Academy of Sciences or PDMI RAS, located in Saint Petersburg, Russia. The name St. Petersburg Department is misleading, however, because the St. Petersburg Department is now an independent institute. In 1966, the Moscow-based Keldysh Institute of Applied Mathematics (Russian: Институт прикладной математики им. М.В.Келдыша) split off from the Steklov Institute.

References

External links
 Steklov Mathematical Institute
 Petersburg Department of Steklov Institute of Mathematics

 
Mathematical institutes
Buildings and structures in Moscow
Education in Moscow
Research institutes in Russia
Universities and institutes established in the Soviet Union
Research institutes in the Soviet Union
Institutes of the Russian Academy of Sciences
1934 establishments in the Soviet Union
Research institutes established in 1934